Zapote District may refer to:

 Zapote District, San José, in San José (canton), San José Province, Costa Rica
 Zapote District, Zarcero, in Zarcero (canton), Alajuela Province, Costa Rica

District name disambiguation pages